The India national handball team is the national handball team of India and is controlled by the Handball Association India.

Tournament record

Asian Men's Handball Championship

Asian Games

South Asian Games

IHF Emerging Nations Championship
2019 – 9th place
2023 – Qualified

References

External links
IHF profile

Men's national handball teams
handball